The Communauté de communes de l'Ouest Vosgien is an administrative association of rural communes in the Vosges and Haute-Marne departments of eastern France. It was created on 1 January 2017 by the merger of the former Communauté de communes du Bassin de Neufchâteau, Communauté de communes du Pays de Châtenois and the commune Aroffe. It consists of 70 communes, and has its administrative offices at Neufchâteau. Its area is 728.5 km2, and its population was 23,270 in 2019.

Composition
The communauté de communes consists of the following 70 communes, of which 1, Liffol-le-Petit, in Haute-Marne:

Aouze
Aroffe
Attignéville
Autigny-la-Tour
Autreville
Avranville
Balléville
Barville
Bazoilles-sur-Meuse
Brechainville
Certilleux
Châtenois
Chermisey
Circourt-sur-Mouzon
Clérey-la-Côte
Courcelles-sous-Châtenois
Coussey
Darney-aux-Chênes
Dolaincourt
Dommartin-sur-Vraine
Domrémy-la-Pucelle
Frebécourt
Fréville
Gironcourt-sur-Vraine
Grand
Greux
Harchéchamp
Harmonville
Houéville
Jainvillotte
Jubainville
Landaville
Lemmecourt
Liffol-le-Grand
Liffol-le-Petit
Longchamp-sous-Châtenois
Maconcourt
Martigny-les-Gerbonvaux
Maxey-sur-Meuse
Ménil-en-Xaintois
Midrevaux
Moncel-sur-Vair
Mont-lès-Neufchâteau
Morelmaison
Neufchâteau
La Neuveville-sous-Châtenois
Ollainville
Pargny-sous-Mureau
Pleuvezain
Pompierre
Punerot
Rainville
Rebeuville
Removille
Rollainville
Rouvres-la-Chétive
Ruppes
Saint-Menge
Saint-Paul
Sartes
Seraumont
Sionne
Soncourt
Soulosse-sous-Saint-Élophe
Tilleux
Trampot
Tranqueville-Graux
Villouxel
Viocourt
Vouxey

References

Ouest Vosgien
Ouest Vosgien
Ouest Vosgien